The Clan is a 2005 Italian comedy film directed by Christian De Sica.

Cast
Christian De Sica as Franco 
Paolo Conticini as Dino 
Sebastien Torkia as Sammy
Andrea Osvárt as Patricia
Linda Batista as Helen Carter
Max Tortora as Bob / Otello / Pedro
Anna Longhi as Aunt Luciana
Hristo Dimitrov as the policeman
Nadia Rinaldi as the nun

References

External links

2005 films
Films directed by Christian De Sica
2000s Italian-language films
2005 comedy films
Italian comedy films
2000s Italian films